Shopping for Fangs is a 1997 American-Canadian black comedy film directed by Quentin Lee and Justin Lin, starring Radmar Agana Jao. The film marks the debut of actor John Cho.

Plot 
Housewife Katherine loses consciousness and loses her cell phone as a result. Lesbian waitress Trinh sends her sexually suggestive messages and pictures. Katherine's husband works with a man by the name of Phil.

Payroll clerk Phil, who is confused about his sexuality, thinks that he is transforming into a werewolf because his hair grows so quickly that he has to shave every hour, he gorges on raw meat, and he is uninjured after being struck by a car.

Cast

Production
The film's budget was less than $100,000 and had a filming schedule of 21 days in Los Angeles and the San Gabriel Valley. The film was partially funded with a Canada Council grant. Lee and Lin separated the filming between themselves, with Lee filming the part with Katherine and Lin filming the part with Phil. The term "GenerAsian X" may have been coined because of this film's release, with the X later being removed.

Lee said in a 2012 interview, "Shopping for Fangs is about finding connections, which is a theme that threads through all my movies." He also said, "It’s hard to quantify cultural impact, but certainly years after, scholars and critics are still talking about Shopping for Fangs." He added, "In our culture now we tend to think of people as having fixed identities. We tried to use the myths in the film to make these identities fluid again and make us question what we’re really about."

Release 
The film premiered at the 1997 San Francisco International Asian American Film Festival (CAAMFest) on March 7, 1997. It also screened at the 1997 Toronto International Film Festival. The film was distributed by Lin's company Margin Films.

Reception
J.R. Jones of the Chicago Reader commented, "Like so many other indie releases of its time, this 1997 comedy is a knockoff of Pulp Fiction, with oddball characters, intersecting story lines, and plenty of B-movie flash. But it’s got real energy, and its solid grounding in LA’s Asian community gives the laughs a genuine cultural point of view."

David Noh, writing for Film Journal, said, "Under the circumstances, the actors manage to do rather nicely." Edward Guthmann, of San Francisco Chronicle, wrote, "Despite some fresh ideas, attractive actors and a sly, surprising performance by Chin as the disaffected Katherine, this is a rough first effort."

Home media
The film was released on DVD on October 6, 2009 by Pathfinder Home Entertainment.

References

External links

 

1997 comedy films
1997 LGBT-related films
1997 films
American LGBT-related films
Canadian LGBT-related films
American black comedy films
Canadian black comedy films
English-language Canadian films
LGBT-related comedy films
LGBT-related black comedy films
Films directed by Justin Lin
Films about Chinese Americans
Films about Taiwanese Americans
Comedy films about Asian Americans
LGBT-related films about Chinese Americans
Asian-American LGBT-related films
Films shot in Los Angeles
1997 directorial debut films
1997 independent films
1990s English-language films
1990s American films
1990s Canadian films